All's Well, Ends Well or abbreviated as AWEW (Chinese: 家有囍事) is a 1992 Hong Kong comedy film directed by Clifton Ko. The film stars Leslie Cheung, Stephen Chow, Raymond Wong, Maggie Cheung, Sandra Ng, and Teresa Mo.

All's Well, Ends Well was a Lunar New Year film, where a film's release was timed to coincide with the larger movie audience at that time of year.  The movie is also one of Stephen Chow's trademark 'mo lei tau' films of little sense but much good-natured humour, and is still considered to be a cult classic by most Hong Kong audiences.

The film was followed by seven sequels:
All's Well, Ends Well Too (1993)
All's Well, Ends Well 1997 (1997)
All's Well, Ends Well 2009 (2009)
All's Well, Ends Well 2010 (2010)
All's Well, Ends Well 2011 (2011)
All's Well, Ends Well 2012 (2012)
All's Well, Ends Well 2020 (2020)

Plot details
All's Well, Ends Well is a comic romance of three hapless brothers, who eventually learn through their amorous exploits and misadventures that love is only won through gradual nurturing, and quickly lost through the quick, dishonest, selfish ways which they have always taken for granted.

Moon (Raymond Wong) is eldest brother and head of the family. The film begins with the celebration of his 7th anniversary wedding with Leng, which celebration he deserts, preferring instead the company of his mistress (Sheila Chan). He turns up at home with her later, forcing his wife (whom he calls 'hag') to leave the house in dismay. Although she is very devoted to her husband and tolerates him for all his misbehaviours, her tolerance stops short of accepting his mistress openly in the family home.

So (Leslie Cheung) is an effeminate floral arranger and lecturer at an art school, who is good at cooking and enjoys women's hobbies. His second cousin Mo-seung comes to his house on that same evening, and entirely devours an elaborate gourmet banquet which So had intended as a gift for Leng on her otherwise disastrous wedding anniversary. From that day on, So and Mo-seung are constantly at loggerheads over trivial issues, insulting each other with vulgar metaphors during a mahjong game session, apparently irreconcilable.

Foon is a local radio DJ who flirts shamelessly while on air and is well-known among his legion of female fans for his impressive kissing technique. Holli-yuk (Maggie Cheung) calls him on air one day and arranges a date with him. She is an avid Hollywood movie lover who enjoys re-enacting particular love-scenes from movies. She is convinced that Foon shares her romantic outlook and they soon become lovers.  Foon, however, is a notorious playboy not eager to settle down.  Predictably, Holli-yuk catches him in an act of infidelity.  After a freak accident leaves Foon suffering from a mildly debilitating mental illness, Holli-yuk offers to become a nurse for him.  Taking advantage of her role as his nurturer, she gleefully devises methods to punish him for his callous behaviour.

The brothers' dilemmas are later resolved in similarly titled sequel films. Each story concludes on a cheeky and high-spirited note.

Cast and roles
 Stephen Chow as Seung Foon, a womanizer DJ who enjoys flirting while on broadcast
 Maggie Cheung as Holli-yuk, an art film-lover who dreams of finding her dream guy
 Leslie Cheung as Seung So, Foon's effeminate elder brother who is a floral arranger
 Teresa Mo as Leung Mo-seung, So's second cousin and nemesis turned lover
 Raymond Wong as Seung Moon, Foon's eldest brother who is unfaithful
 Sandra Ng as Leng, Wife of Moon who was divorced and then remarried
 Sheila Chan as Sheila, Moon's mistress who was once a beauty pageant winner
 Lee Heung-kam as Mama Seung, the brothers' mother
 Kwan Hoi-san as Papa Seung, the brothers' father
 Clifton Ko as an annoyed karaoke patron
 Vincent Kok as a Japanese businessman
 Loletta Lee as one of Foon's girlfriends
 James Wong
 Wong Kwong-leung as Brother Kwong
 Andrew Yuen as Kai-ming
 Cheri Ho as Dolleen
 Chow Chi-fai as a doctor

References

External links

All's Well Ends Well 1992 at Hong Kong Cinemagic
All's Well, Ends Well 1992 at chinesemov.com

1992 films
1992 comedy films
Hong Kong slapstick comedy films
1990s Cantonese-language films
Films set in Hong Kong
Films shot in Hong Kong
Films directed by Clifton Ko
1990s Hong Kong films